Westwood is a town in the Rockhampton Region and a locality split between the Rockhampton Region and the Shire of Banana in Queensland, Australia. It was the first town that was gazetted by the Queensland Government.

Geography 
The Capricorn Highway passes through the town, and the intersection with the Leichhardt Highway is a few kilometres to the southwest. The town of Westwood consists of a handful of houses, a hotel, and a police station. The major industry of the area is cattle grazing. The northern half of the locality of Westwood is in Rockhampton region while the southern part is in the Shire of Banana.

History 

Although towns such as Brisbane, Maryborough and Rockhampton had been gazetted by the New South Wales Government prior to the separation of Queensland, Westwood was the first town to be gazetted by the newly established Queensland Government on 23 May 1860. Although the area was named Prestone on the original survey plan, Queensland Governor George Bowen decided to name the town Westwood after Westwood House, the home of Sir John Pakington, the Secretary of State for the Colonies and War in 1852.

In 1867, the Great Northern Railway (now known as the Central Western Line) reached the area from Rockhampton, and Westwood became the railhead. The first load of wool was railed from the town on 23 August.

Westwood State School opened on 26 August 1872.

A Protestant church opened in Westwood on Thursday 2 October 1873.

The town was meant to be the railhead for only a short time. However, bureaucracy and financial difficulties for the state meant that the next section of the line did not commence construction until 1873. The significance of Westwood declined when the railhead moved further west.

On Saturday 6 September 1919, John Huxham, the Queensland Home Secretary opened the Westwood Sanatorium, a 64-bed sanitorium was opened in Westwood to treat miner's phthisis, a lung disease suffered by miners from working in dusty conditions. Later, it treated patients with tuberculous. In 1953, a ¾ mile bitumen road was built from the Huxham railway siding (just to the north of Westwood) to the sanitorium and named Haigh Drive in memory of Leonard Garfield Haigh, the former chairman of the Rockhampton Hospitals Board from 2 June 1933 to 16 February 1953. Commencing with a tiled-roof waiting shed at the siding with a plaque commemorating Haigh, the drive to the sanitorium was flanked with Peltophorum trees and was officially opened by James Larcombe (MLA for Rockhampton) in the presence of Haigh's widow on Sunday 1 November 1953. More effective medical treatments for tuberculous resulted in the closure of the sanitorium in 1959, but the building continued to be used as a nursing home until the 1980s. The sanitorium buildings were then relocated or demolished; one is in use as a private home in Emerald.

In 1996, Westwood held its first Anzac Day ceremony at its new memorial which was dedicated the same day.  The event, organised by the Westwood Progress Association, was attended by approximately 80 people including official guests Fitzroy Shire mayor Mary Seierup, state MP Jim Pearce and federal MP Paul Marek.  Fitzroy Shire councillor Vince Reynolds was the master of ceremonies while Uniting Church pastor Dorothy Demack served as the worship leader.

Heritage listings 
Westwood has the following heritage-listed sites:
 remains of the Adolphus William Copper Smelter

Education 
Westwood State School is a government primary (Prep-6) school for boys and girls at 108 Herbert Street. In 2017, the school had an enrolment of 13 students with 2 teachers (1 full-time equivalent) and 4 non-teaching staff (2 full-time equivalent).

References

Further reading

External links

 
 Town map of Westwood, 1973

Towns in Queensland
Suburbs of Rockhampton Region
Shire of Banana
Localities in Queensland